Narcisco Suárez Amador (born July 18, 1960, in Valladolid) is a Spanish sprint canoer who competed from the early 1980s to the early 1990s. Competing in four Summer Olympics, he won a bronze medal in the C-2 500 m event at Los Angeles in 1984.

References
Sports-reference.com profile
Spanish Olympic Committee

1960 births
Canoeists at the 1980 Summer Olympics
Canoeists at the 1984 Summer Olympics
Canoeists at the 1988 Summer Olympics
Canoeists at the 1992 Summer Olympics
Living people
Olympic canoeists of Spain
Olympic bronze medalists for Spain
Spanish male canoeists
Sportspeople from Valladolid
Olympic medalists in canoeing
Medalists at the 1984 Summer Olympics
20th-century Spanish people
21st-century Spanish people